is a Japanese politician of the Liberal Democratic Party, a member of the House of Representatives in the Diet (national legislature). A native of Gojō, Nara and graduate of Nagoya Institute of Technology, he had served in the city assembly of Gojo for two terms since 1973 and the assembly of Nara Prefecture for two terms since 1983. After an unsuccessful run in 1990, he was elected to the House of Representatives for the first time in 1993.

References

External links 
  in Japanese.

Living people
1943 births
Liberal Democratic Party (Japan) politicians
Members of the House of Representatives (Japan)
21st-century Japanese politicians